Coronto International was a seminal compas band from Haiti formed in 1955 by saxophone players Nemours Jean-Baptiste and Weber Sicot. Initial band members included Anulis Cadet, Kreutzer Duroseau, who originally came up with the name compa direct, because Nemours was Maestro of the band, took all the credit for himself, Mozart Duroseau, Kreutzer and Mozart are brothers, Monfort Jean-Baptiste, and Julien Paul.
Kreutzer was the best Tambour (Conga) player in Haiti. 

The band's music was popular among the higher classes of Haiti, reportedly including the family of François Duvalier. 

In 1956, Sicot left the band to form another compas band, Latino. That same year, Nemours would rename Coronto as Enssemble Au Calbasse, and later as Ensemble Nemours Jean-Baptiste.

External links
Kompa.blog entry on Nemours Jean-Baptiste
compas Musicians Biography

Haitian musical groups